Liana Bridges (born 25 December 1969) is a British actress and presenter. Best known for co-presenting Sooty & Co. with Matthew Corbett and Richard Cadell in 1998, and Sooty Heights with Richard Cadell from 1999 to 2000.

When Sooty Heights ended, her place as co-presenter was taken by Vicki Lee Taylor in the replacement series, Sooty.

She wrote a panto diary for BBC Radio Cambridgeshire from 1 December 2003 to 11 January 2004.

Bridges was appointed artistic director at Kingsway Hall in Dovercourt in December 2007.

Liana co-presents a radio show, the Essex Quest, on BBC Essex every Sunday morning between 10am and 2pm. The programme sees Bridges (with Barry Lewis) on the roads of Essex searching for locations based on clues set by the producers at the radio station's headquarters in Chelmsford. Listeners call and message the show in an effort to help the team solve the clues.

Personal life
Bridges was born in Harwich, Essex and attended Harwich School, Colchester Sixth Form College, and Mountview Stage School. She is married and has two sons, born in 2004 and 2007.

External links

References

1969 births
Living people
English film actresses
English television actresses
People from Harwich
Actresses from Essex
20th-century English actresses
21st-century English actresses